La Rambla is a  sport climb at the limestone El Pati crag in Siurana, Catalonia in Spain. While there has been debate about La Rambla'''s grade, there is now consensus that it meets the  threshold. It is an important and historic route in climbing, and is part of the coveted "9a+ trilogy" with Realization and Papichulo.

History

Huber explained in a 2008 interview that he felt his 35-metre route was no more difficult than Wolfgang Güllich's 1991 ascent of Action Directe that was then graded . Huber later believed his 35-metre route should have had a  grade.

After Huber's 1994 ascent, Spanish climber  linked Huber's 35-metre route to the final anchor of La Reina Mora – Huber's original intention – by bolting a short traverse to the right that started from the last hold of Huber's route, a 3-finger pocket just below the intermediate anchor.

Andrada himself was not able to free his new 41-metre bolted route. Instead, it was later freed on 8 March 2003 by Spanish climber Ramón Julián Puigblanque, who redpointed the 35-metre route five times, and only completed Andrada's 6-metre extension after forty failed attempts.

If this was correct, then Huber's original 35-metre La Rambla was the first 9a+, seven years before Chris Sharma's 2001 ascent of Realization/Biographie. In a 2008 interview, Huber said that the 6-metre extension added little difficulty to his original route, and that his original 8c+ route would be graded 9a by contemporary standards, but no more, as ultimately it was not harder than Action Directe, the benchmark 9a route. A second grading debate developed over the use of a big flake (or jug) one metre further to the right of the extension's traverse for resting. Puigblanque said that he had not used this flake on his first ascent and that using the flake made the climb a half grade easier, to which Adam Ondra (who also did not use the flake on his 2008 ascent) agreed with, but caveated saying: "although it is nonsense to consider it [the flake] as prohibited".

It took three years until La Rambla was repeated by Edu Marín Garcia and Chris Sharma, on successive days in 2006.  La Rambla has since become one of the most repeated  routes in the sport, and is now widely considered a consensus .  In March 2013, German climber Alexander Megos came closest to flashing La Rambla, falling on his first attempt near the top, but succeeding on his immediate second attempt.  On 26 February 2017, American climber Margo Hayes became the first female climber in history to climb a  route on La Rambla; Hayes went on to climb Realization/Biography a few months later in September 2017.

RouteLa Rambla is described as having a diverse range of "cracks, pockets, crimps, side pulls, and underclings", but is also "sustained", and "continually overhanging".  Several climbers have described it as being two climbs, the first circa 30-metres being essentially 5.14 climbing, via a 5.13c crack, a traverse to the left, which adds up to 5.14a, and then 5.14b as it moves right until a rest.  At this stage, the climber is approaching the location of Huber's original anchor (since removed), and the climbing becomes even more overhanging "with violent moves on small holds and crimps".  The crux is at 35-metres where, as Ramón Julián Puigblanqué describes, "You have to make the two-finger pocket. If you get the pocket with your right hand you can clip Huber’s intermediate belay and you’ve done [the 35-metre] La Rambla. If you are going for La Rambla Direct [the 41-metre version], you have to take the pocket with your left hand – this is the key move. I made it to this point four or five times".  Ondra graded this crux as a  boulder move.

LegacyLa Rambla is variously described as legendary, historic, and famous in the climbing media, and even two decades on from the various first ascents, repeat ascents of the route are reported on and chronicled by the climbing media. PlanetMountain said in 2017, "Seeped in history, La Rambla is a symbol for sport climbing, one of the world’s most sought-after climbs", and listed La Rambla on its list of important climbs in the evolution of free climbing. When French climber Sébastien Bouin made the 20th ascent in December 2017, he said, "This route is a piece of climbing history".La Rambla has also been reassessed as part of German climber Alexander Huber's sport climbing legacy, and it has become apparent to contemporary extreme sport climbers that Huber was climbing consistently at the grade of 9a/9a+ in the early to mid-1990s, as evidenced by La Rambla and his other test-pieces of Open Air in 1996 (proposed for re-grading by Adam Ondra to 9a+ in 2008, and therefore potentially the first 9a+ as it was climbed before Realization/Biographie), and Weisse Rose in 1994 (also proposed for re-grading by Adam Ondra to at least a "hard 9a").

The ascent of La Rambla at  Siurana, Realization/Biographie at Céüse, and Papichulo at Oliana, have been referred to as the "9a+ trilogy", being long, sustained, and consensus graded 9a+ sport climbing routes, that aspiring extreme sport climbers seek to test themselves on.

 AscentsLa Rambla (being the 41m version post-1994) has been ascended by:

1st (35m version) Alexander Huber in 1994
1st (41m version) Ramón Julián Puigblanqué on 8 March 2003.
2nd. Edu Marín Garcia in December 2006
3rd. Chris Sharma in December 2006
4th.  in 2007
5th. Patxi Usobiaga in 2007
6th. Adam Ondra in February 2008
7th.  in 2011
8th. Sachi Amma in 2012
9th. Felix Neumärker in 2013
10th.  in 2013. 
11th. Alex Megos in March 2013
12th. Daniel Jung in 2014
13th. Jonathan Siegrist in 2015
14th.  in February 2017
15th. Matty Hong in February 2017
16th. Margo Hayes in February 2017; became first woman to climb a 
17th. Stefano Ghisolfi in March 2017
18th. Jacopo Larcher in March 2017
19th.  in 2017
20th. Sébastien Bouin in December 2017
21st. Tomás Ravanal in 2018
22nd. Gerard Rull in 2018
23rd. Jon Cardwell in 2018
24th. Dave Graham in 2019
25th. Piotr Schab in 2019
26th. Gonzalo Larrocha in 2019
27th.  in 2019
28th. Chaehyun Seo in November 2022 
29th. Seb Berthe in January 2023
30th. Michaela Kiersch in January 2023

Filmography
 Margo Hayes' first female and 16th ascent:  

See also
History of rock climbing
List of first ascents (sport climbing)Silence, first climb in the world with a potential grade of La Dura Dura, second climb in the world with a confirmed grade of Jumbo Love, first climb in the world with a confirmed grade of Realization/Biographie, first climb in the world with a confirmed grade of Action Directe, first climb in the world with a confirmed grade of 

References

External links
VINTAGE VIDEO: Dani Andrada on La Rambla (5.15a), Rock & Ice (1996)
Ramón Julián on La Rambla original, 9a+, UKClimbing.com'' (2003)

Climbing routes
1990s in sport climbing
2003 in sport climbing
Climbing areas of Spain
Priorat